Morago is a rural locality in the central part of the Riverina.  It is situated by road, about 19 kilometres north west of Pretty Pine and 86 kilometres south east of Moulamein.  At the 2006 census, Morago had a population of 145 people.

Morago Post Office opened on 16 September 1904 and closed in 1941.

Notes and references

External links

Towns in the Riverina
Towns in New South Wales